William B. Arveson (22 November 1934 – 15 November 2011) was a mathematician specializing in operator algebras who worked as a professor of Mathematics at the University of California, Berkeley.

Biography
Arveson obtained his Ph.D. from UCLA in 1964 with thesis advisor Henry Dye and thesis Prediction theory and group representations.

Of particular note is Arveson's work on completely positive maps. One of his earlier results in this area is an extension theorem for completely positive maps with values in the algebra of all bounded operators on a Hilbert space. This theorem led naturally to the question of injectivity of von-Neumann algebras in general, which culminated in work by Alain Connes relating injectivity to hyperfiniteness.

One of the major features of Arveson's work was the use of algebras of operators to elucidate single operator theory. In a series of papers in the 1960s and 1970s, Arveson introduced noncommutative analogues of several concepts from classical harmonic analysis including the Shilov and Choquet boundaries and used them very successfully in single operator theory.

In a highly cited paper, Arveson made a systematic study of commutative subspace lattices, which yield a large class of nonselfadjoint operator algebras and proved among other results, the theorem that a transitive algebra containing a maximal abelian von Neumann subalgebra in B(H) must be trivial.

In the late 80's and 90's, Arveson played a leading role in developing the theory of one-parameter semigroups of *-endomorphisms on von Neumann algebras - also known as E-semigroups. Among his achievements, he introduced product systems and proved that they are complete invariants of E-semigroups up to cocycle conjugacy.

Selected publications

Books

Papers

References

External links
 
 Directory of operator algebraists
 Bill Arveson's homepage
 

1934 births
2011 deaths
University of California, Los Angeles alumni
20th-century American mathematicians
21st-century American mathematicians
University of California, Berkeley College of Letters and Science faculty
Operator theorists